Zhong Guiqing (born 5 July 1977) is a Chinese former track and field athlete who competed in the pole vault. She was a one-time Chinese national champion.

Zhong was active in the early history of women's pole vaulting, starting to achieve results at national level in 1994 – five years before the women's event first featured at the World Championships in Athletics. Both Sun and Zhong achieved the same mark that day, with Zhong taking the championship title on count-back rules. The International Association of Athletics Federations only began ratifying women's pole vault world records in 1992 and Zhong's mark made her China's second consecutive record holder in the event.

Reflecting the growing popularity of the sport, Zhong was one of five women to hold the world record that season, alongside Sun, Bártová, Andrea Müller and Emma George. Zhong eventually ranked sixth globally for the season in 1995, and third among Chinese athletes behind Sun and Cai Weiyan.

Despite her improvements, the sport was being pushed to new heights at the same time and George's world record reached  that July. Zhong was again behind her national rivals Sun and Cai, though her season's best height placed her equal eighth on the global rankings for the year. Zhong's last vault over four metres came in the 1997, but she dropped out of the world top twenty. She continued to compete until 2001, at which point her career came to a close.

National titles
Chinese Athletics Championships
Pole vault: 1995

References

External links

Living people
1977 births
Chinese female pole vaulters
World record setters in athletics (track and field)